Petar Ivanov may refer to:
 Petar Ivanov (rower)
 Petar Ivanov (footballer)
 Petar Ivanov (wrestler)